This article shows all participating women's volleyball squads at the 2011 Pan American Games, held from October 15 to 20, 2011 in Guadalajara, Jalisco, Mexico.

Head Coach: José Roberto Guimarães

Head Coach: Arnd Ludwig

Head Coach: Juan Carlos Gala

Head Coach: Marcos Kwiek

Head Coach: Mario Herrera

Head Coach: Luca Cristofani

Head Coach: David Alemán

Head Coach: John Banachowski

References

External links
 NORCECA

P
P
Team squads at the 2011 Pan American Games